The Spectrum Range, formerly called the Spectrum Mountains and the Rainbow Mountains, is a subrange of the Tahltan Highland in the Stikine Country of northwestern British Columbia, 20 km west of the Stewart-Cassiar Highway, south of Mount Edziza and north of the Arctic Lake Plateau. The Spectrum Range falls within Mount Edziza Provincial Park. The range is lightly glaciated, as compared to the other ranges to the west. It is accessible only by foot or via helicopter; there are no roads to the range.

Geology

Like the Rainbow and Itcha–Ilgachuz Ranges at the western end of the Chilcotin Plateau farther south, the range's name derives from the brilliant colours that are symptomatic from heavy mineralization comprising the material forming the range.

The Spectrum Range is one of four large stratovolcanoes that make up the Mount Edziza volcanic complex. A predominantly lava dome overlies a basal shield volcano. The range is Pliocene in age and on its southwestern flank contains Pleistocene subglacial and subaerial cones and its northwest and southwest sides contain Holocene pyroclastic cones and lava flows. The youngest feature in the volcanic complex could be The Ash Pit.

Mountains

Artifact Ridge
Kitsu Peak
Kounugu Mountain
Kuno Peak
Little Iskut
Obsidian Ridge
Spectrum Dome
Yagi Ridge
Yeda Peak

See also
List of volcanoes in Canada
List of Northern Cordilleran volcanoes
List of mountain ranges
Volcanism of Canada
Volcanism of Western Canada
Rainbow Range (Chilcotin Plateau) (aka Rainbow Mountains)

References

External links
Canadian Mountain Encyclopedia
 

Mount Edziza volcanic complex
Stratovolcanoes of Canada
Lava domes
Pliocene volcanoes
Polygenetic volcanoes
Tahltan Highland
Mountain ranges of British Columbia